Galatasaray SK Men's 1989–1990 season is the 1989–1990 basketball season for Turkish professional basketball club Galatasaray SK.

The club competes in:
Turkish Basketball League

Depth chart

Squad changes for the 1989–1990 season

In:

Out:

Results, schedules and standings

Turkish Basketball League 1989–90

Regular season

Pts=Points, Pld=Matches played, W=Matches won, L=Matches lost, F=Points for, A=Points against

1st Half

2nd Half

Playoffs

Quarter-finals Group

Fenerbahçe and Galatasaray joined semi-finals automatically. Tofaş SAS, the second league winner, joined play off quarter finals. Efes Pilsen and Paşabahçe SK qualified for the semi finals after the matches in Ankara.

Semi-finals

Finals

President Cup

Notes

References
 Milliyet Newspaper Archive 1989-90

Galatasaray S.K. (men's basketball) seasons
Galatasaray Sports Club 1989–90 season